Rehoboth is an unincorporated community in DeKalb County, in the U.S. state of Georgia.

History
The community was named after Rehoboth, a place mentioned in the Hebrew Bible.

References

Unincorporated communities in DeKalb County, Georgia
Unincorporated communities in Georgia (U.S. state)